Common Goal is a pledge-based charitable movement by streetfootballworld for the football industry, which was launched with the public support of Spanish footballer Juan Mata.

The movement encourages professional football players and coaches to pledge at least one percent of their salaries to a collective fund that supports football charities around the world. According to founder Jürgen Griesbeck, the movement was created to build a sustainable and lasting connection between the football industry and social change.

The movement was launched on 4 August 2017, with Mata announcing his intention to make the pledge via an article in The Player's Tribune. He then urged his fellow footballers to join him, claiming that Common Goal is the most effective and sustainable way that football can deliver long-term social impact on a global scale.

History 

On 29 November 2017, UEFA president Aleksander Čeferin became the first football leader to join Common Goal. Čeferin stated he believed that football has the power to change the world and he was inspired by Juan Mata to join this movement. He also called on his fellow football players, coaches, clubs and leagues to show if they care about social responsibility.

On 18 January 2018, Asian Football Confederation executive committee member Moya Dodd joined Common Goal to take on a role as the management committee of the movement, working to allocate money to various football programs across the globe.

On 21 May 2018, FC Nordsjælland became the first football club to join Common Goal. The club's CEO, Søren Kristensen, said that the club would like to make a difference to others through football, whether it be regarding gender equality or developing young people and football players. Additionally, the entire ten-member management, club chairman and backroom staff pledged one percent of their salary, and all player and administrative staff contracts include the same pledge with the option to opt-out.

On 30 August 2018, Banco Santander became the first sponsor of the UEFA Champions League to support Common Goal and to work together over the following three years to use football to support financial inclusion.

On 5 October 2018, it was announced that, as part of a partnership with EA Sports, FIFA 19 would feature Common Goal as part of "The Journey", a game mode in which players take control of fictional character Alex Hunter, affording players the chance for Hunter to join the movement during the character's rise through the professional game. EA Sports also donated $200,000 in support of the movement and its capacity to drive progress towards achieving the UN Global Goals with the aid of football.

On 17 January 2019, the Manchester United Supporters' Trust (MUST) became the first supporters' trust in the world to make the pledge to Common Goal, announcing that MUST members will donate 1% of their membership fees to the charity and helping to promote Common Goal to the wider global Manchester United supporter base, and through other fan organisations.

In May 2019, Australian women's players Aivi Luik and Alex Chidiac became the 99th and 100th players to join Common Goal, equaling the ratio of men and women.

On 23 September 2019, Jürgen Klopp became the first Premier League coach to join Common Goal. He made the announcement during his speech as he collected the Men's Coach of the Year prize at the Best FIFA Football Awards in Milan, Italy.

Current members

Players and managers

Note

Businesses

External links

References

International charities